Blood Ties is an expression indicating consanguinity. It may also refer to:

Film
 Blood Ties (1964 film), a 1964 film directed by Mikhail Yershov and starring Vija Artmane and Evgeniy Matveyev
 Blood Ties: The Life and Work of Sally Mann, a 1994 documentary film
 Blood Ties (2009 film), a 2009 Singaporean film
 Blood Ties (2013 film), an American film starring  Clive Owen and Billy Crudup

Television
 Blood Ties (1986 film) or Il cugino americano, a 1986 television film about Italian mob starring Brad Davis
 Blood Ties (1991 film), a 1991 television film and failed pilot about a clan of Los Angeles vampires; first aired on the Fox network
 Blood Ties (TV series), a 2007 television series based on the Blood Books series of novels by Tanya Huff
 Blood Ties (Homicide: Life on the Street), the première three-part episode (1997) of the sixth season of the television series Homicide: Life on the Street
 "Blood Ties" (Diagnosis: Murder), the 21st episode (1999) of the sixth season of the television series Diagnosis: Murder
 "Blood Ties" (Buffy the Vampire Slayer), the 13th episode (2001) of the fifth season of the television series Buffy the Vampire Slayer
 "Blood Ties", the 20th episode (2004) of the third season of the television series Alias
 "Blood Ties" (Legends of Tomorrow), an episode of Legends of Tomorrow

Other
 Blood Tie, a 1977 novel by Mary Lee Settle, winner of the National Book Award for Fiction
 Blood Ties (Hinton novel), a 2000 novel for people learning English
 Blood Ties (McKenzie novel), a 2008 novel by Sophie McKenzie, winner of the Red House Children's Book Award
 Bloodties (comics), a 1993 Marvel Comics crossover
 Blood Ties, a 2009 musical by Anika Johnson and Barbara Johnston (well known for being featured in season 2 of Orphan Black (2014))

See also
 
 
 Blood (disambiguation)
 Tie (disambiguation)
 Blood Relations (disambiguation)